Brook Bay is a bay on the south western coast of the Isle of Wight, England. It lies to the west of the village of Brook. It faces south west out into the English Channel. It stretches about 2km from Hanover Point in the east to Sudmoor Point to the west. Much of the surrounding land, including the hamlet of Brookgreen is owned by the National Trust.

The beach is predominantly sand. The seabed is rocky to the west as it consists of the hazardous Brook Ledges but is rock-free near the concrete slipway.

The bay is best accessed from the nearby car park and the slipway down to the beach.

Both Brook Chine and Churchill Chine empty into Brook Bay.

The Isle of Wight Coastal Path runs along the cliff edge for the entire extent of the bay

External links

Bays of the Isle of Wight
Brighstone